A by-election was held in the New South Wales Legislative Assembly seat of Monaro on 12 February 2022 upon the resignation of Deputy Premier of New South Wales and Nationals MP John Barilaro.

Background
The retiring member is former Deputy Premier of New South Wales John Barilaro. He previously served as the Minister for Regional Development (later renamed Minister for Regional New South Wales), Minister for Small Business, and Minister for Skills in the first Berejiklian and second Baird governments, from October 2014 until March 2019; and as the Minister for Regional Tourism in the first Baird government. In October 2021, he announced his resignation as Deputy Premier, Leader of the National Party and member for Monaro, saying it was "the right time for me to hand the reins over".

The Monaro by-election was held on the same day as by-elections for the districts of Bega, Strathfield and Willoughby. The writs for election were issued on 21 January 2022. Nominations for candidates closed seven days later at noon on 27 January, with the ballot paper draw commencing in the morning of 28 January.

The NSW Electoral Commission pre-emptively sent postal ballots to all voters registered on the state electoral roll for the relevant districts, under a regulation in a COVID amendment to the Electoral Act. Postal votes will be checked against in-person voting rolls to prevent double voting. The iVote online voting system was not used at these elections after the system failed during the NSW local government elections in December 2021.

Candidates

Results

See also
Electoral results for the district of Monaro
List of New South Wales state by-elections

References

External links
New South Wales Electoral Commission: Monaro State by-election

2022 elections in Australia
New South Wales state by-elections